Qanatabad may refer to:

Qanatabad, Ilam
Qanatabad, Lorestan